The 2012–13 Iona Gaels men's basketball team represented Iona College during the 2012–13 NCAA Division I men's basketball season. The Gaels, led by third year head coach Tim Cluess, played their home games at the Hynes Athletic Center and were members of the Metro Atlantic Athletic Conference. They finished the season 20–14, 11–7 in MAAC play to finish in a tie for fourth place. They were champions of the MAAC tournament, defeating Manhattan in the championship game, to earn an automatic bid to the 2013 NCAA tournament where they lost in the second round to Ohio State.

Roster

Schedule

|-
!colspan=9| Regular season

|-
!colspan=9| 2013 MAAC men's basketball tournament

|-
!colspan=9| 2013 NCAA tournament

References

Iona Gaels men's basketball seasons
Iona
Iona
Iona Gaels men's basketball
Iona Gaels men's basketball